Antoine Labotte Carr (born July 23, 1961) is an American retired basketball player. Nicknamed "Big Dawg", he played power forward (and sometimes center) for six different teams in the National Basketball Association across 16 seasons.

Early life

Antoine Carr was born in Oklahoma City. and was a star basketball player at Wichita Heights High School (class of 1979).  He accepted a scholarship to play locally at Wichita State University.  A four-year player, Carr was a major contributor on a team that included future NBA players Xavier McDaniel and Cliff Levingston, averaging 17 points per game while shooting over 55% during his college career.  In his final college game, he scored a school-record 47 points against Southern Illinois on March 5, 1983.

He played for the US national team in the 1982 FIBA World Championship, winning the silver medal.

Professional career

Coming off a senior season where he'd averaged 22.5 points and 7.6 rebounds a game in a strong college program, Carr was selected by the Detroit Pistons in the first round (eighth pick overall) of the 1983 NBA draft. Carr was unable to agree to a contract with the Pistons and played the 1983–84 season in Italy with Simac Milano after the club offered him a $200,000 contract for the year. Returning to the NBA in the 1984–85 season, he played six full seasons with the Atlanta Hawks, who had acquired his rights, before moving to the Sacramento Kings in the middle of the 1989–90 campaign.  While in Sacramento, Carr averaged 20 points per game and was one of the team's stars.  He scored 1,551 points that season, his only time topping 1,000 points and by far his best scoring season.  Carr also played for the San Antonio Spurs, where he led the team in field goal percentage. He also played a notable first-round series in 1994 against the Utah Jazz. Carr was filling in for an injured David Robinson, who had a fractured hand. Carr put on what could be considered the best games of his career, but the Spurs still lost the series 1–3.  Carr was signed as a free agent by the Utah Jazz on October 29, 1994, where he was a periodic starter at the center position beside power forward Karl Malone.  When not starting, he settled in as his role as the energetic and jovial sixth man.  Coach Jerry Sloan utilized Carr extensively during the two years that the Jazz reached the NBA finals – relying on his experience and ability to control the ball.  Carr helped the Jazz to victory in Game 5 of the 1998 Finals against the Chicago Bulls with several clutch jump shots. Carr finished his career with the Houston Rockets and Vancouver Grizzlies, playing 18 games with Houston and 21 with Vancouver in a reserve role.

Carr scored 9,176 points in his NBA career.  Carr had a strong ability to manage the ball down low, even as a small center.  He was known for his power and dunking, and his ability to hit medium to long jump shots under pressure. He made 50% of his attempts from the floor and shot 78% from the free-throw line.  After receiving an eye injury, Carr wore orange-tinted protective glasses for the rest of his NBA career.

Following his final season with Vancouver, Carr played one season for the Kansas City Knights of the ABA, and one season with the Greek club Ionikos NF.

His younger brother Henry Carr played for Wichita State, and was drafted in 1987 by the Los Angeles Clippers.

NBA career statistics

Regular season 

|-
| style="text-align:left;"| 
| style="text-align:left;"|Atlanta
| 62 || 15 || 19.3 || .528 || .333 || .789 || 3.7 || 1.3 || 0.5 || 1.3 || 8.0
|-
| style="text-align:left;"| 
| style="text-align:left;"|Atlanta
| 17 || 0 || 15.2 || .527 || – || .667 || 3.1 || 0.8 || 0.4 || 0.9 || 6.8
|-
| style="text-align:left;"| 
| style="text-align:left;"|Atlanta
| 65 || 2 || 10.7 || .506 || .333 || .709 || 2.4 || 0.5 || 0.2 || 0.7 || 5.3
|-
| style="text-align:left;"| 
| style="text-align:left;"|Atlanta
| 80 || 2 || 18.5 || .544 || .250 || .780 || 3.6 || 1.3 || 0.5 || 1.0 || 8.8
|-
| style="text-align:left;"| 
| style="text-align:left;"|Atlanta
| 78 || 12 || 19.1 || .480 || .000 || .855 || 3.5 || 1.2 || 0.4 || 0.8 || 7.5
|-
| style="text-align:left;"| 
| style="text-align:left;"|Atlanta
| 44 || 0 || 18.3 || .516 || .000 || .775 || 3.4 || 1.2 || 0.3 || 0.8 || 7.6
|-
| style="text-align:left;"| 
| style="text-align:left;"|Sacramento
| 33 || 4 || 28.0 || .482 || .000 || .806 || 5.2 || 2.0 || 0.5 || 1.0 || 18.6
|-
| style="text-align:left;"| 
| style="text-align:left;"|Sacramento
| 77 || 48 || 32.8 || .511 || .000 || .758 || 5.5 || 2.5 || 0.6 || 1.3 || 20.1
|-
| style="text-align:left;"| 
| style="text-align:left;"|San Antonio
| 81 || 27 || 23.0 || .490 || .200 || .764 || 4.3 || 2.8 || 1.4 || 1.2 || 10.9
|-
| style="text-align:left;"| 
| style="text-align:left;"|San Antonio
| 71 || 46 || 27.4 || .538 || .000 || .777 || 5.5 || 1.4 || 0.5 || 1.2 || 13.1
|-
| style="text-align:left;"| 
| style="text-align:left;"|San Antonio
| 34 || 0 || 13.7 || .488 || .000 || .724 || 1.5 || 0.4 || 0.3 || 0.6 || 5.8
|-
| style="text-align:left;"| 
| style="text-align:left;"|Utah
| 78 || 4 || 21.5 || .531 || .250 || .821 || 3.4 || 0.9 || 0.3 || 0.9 || 9.6
|-
| style="text-align:left;"| 
| style="text-align:left;"|Utah
| 80 || 0 || 19.2 || .457 || .000 || .792 || 2.5 || 0.9 || 0.4 || 0.8 || 7.3
|-
| style="text-align:left;"| 
| style="text-align:left;"|Utah
| 82 || 0 || 17.8 || .483 || .000 || .780 || 2.4 || 0.9 || 0.3 || 0.8 || 7.4
|-
| style="text-align:left;"| 
| style="text-align:left;"|Utah
| 66 || 8 || 16.5 || .465 || – || .776 || 2.0 || 0.7 || 0.2 || 0.8 || 5.7
|-
| style="text-align:left;"| 
| style="text-align:left;"|Houston
| 18 || 0 || 8.4 || .404 || .000 || .714 || 1.7 || 0.5 || 0.1 || 0.6 || 2.6
|-
| style="text-align:left;"| 
| style="text-align:left;"|Vancouver
| 21 || 0 || 10.5 || .438 || – || .786 || 1.5 || 0.3 || 0.1 || 0.3 || 3.2
|- class="sortbottom"
| style="text-align:center;" colspan="2"| Career
| 987 || 168 || 20.0 || .503 || .130 || .780 || 3.4 || 1.1 || 0.4 || 0.9 || 9.3

Playoffs 

|-
|style="text-align:left;"|1987
|style="text-align:left;"|Atlanta
|9||0||18.0||.696||–||.813||3.0||1.4||0.3||0.9||11.6
|-
|style="text-align:left;"|1988
|style="text-align:left;"|Atlanta
|12||0||17.5||.529||.000||.643||3.4||1.3||0.3||1.4||6.8
|-
|style="text-align:left;"|1989
|style="text-align:left;"|Atlanta
|5||0||16.2||.619||–||.727||1.6||1.4||0.0||0.8||6.8
|-
|style="text-align:left;"|1992
|style="text-align:left;"|San Antonio
|3||3||36.3||.545||.500||.625||7.7||1.0||0.7||3.7||19.7
|-
|style="text-align:left;"|1993
|style="text-align:left;"|San Antonio
|8||8||21.4||.527||–||.600||4.8||1.1||0.4||1.1||10.5
|-
|style="text-align:left;"|1994
|style="text-align:left;"|San Antonio
|3||0||12.3||.455||–||.889||0.3||1.0||0.3||0.7||6.0
|-
|style="text-align:left;"|1995
|style="text-align:left;"|Utah
|5||0||22.8||.452||–||.833||3.0||1.4||0.6||1.0||9.6
|-
|style="text-align:left;"|1996
|style="text-align:left;"|Utah
|18||0||18.8||.474||–||.680||1.9||1.2||0.2||0.8||6.1
|-
|style="text-align:left;"|1997
|style="text-align:left;"|Utah
|20||0||14.0||.482||–||.750||2.0||0.5||0.3||0.5||4.9
|-
|style="text-align:left;"|1998
|style="text-align:left;"|Utah
|20||0||14.6||.456||–||.750||2.1||0.6||0.1||0.6||4.4
|-
|style="text-align:left;"|1999
|style="text-align:left;"|Houston
|4||0||9.3||.364||–||–||1.8||1.0||0.0||0.3||2.0
|- class="sortbottom"
| style="text-align:center;" colspan="2"| Career
| 107 || 11 || 17.1 || .514 || .333 || .740 || 2.6 || 1.0 || 0.3 || 0.9 || 6.8

References

External links
 at NBA.com

1961 births
Living people
1982 FIBA World Championship players
20th-century African-American sportspeople
21st-century African-American people
African-American basketball players
All-American college men's basketball players
American expatriate basketball people in Canada
American expatriate basketball people in Greece
American expatriate basketball people in Italy
American men's basketball players
Atlanta Hawks players
Basketball players from Wichita, Kansas
Basketball players from Oklahoma
Centers (basketball)
Detroit Pistons draft picks
Houston Rockets players
Ionikos N.F. B.C. players
Kansas City Knights players
McDonald's High School All-Americans
Olimpia Milano players
Power forwards (basketball)
Sacramento Kings players
San Antonio Spurs players
Sportspeople from Oklahoma City
United States men's national basketball team players
Utah Jazz players
Vancouver Grizzlies players
Wichita State Shockers men's basketball players